Aamir Mehmood Kiani is a Pakistani politician who served Federal Minister for National Health Services, Regulation and Coordination, from 20 August 2018 to 18 April 2019. He had been a member of the National Assembly of Pakistan from August 2018 till January 2023.

Political career
He was elected to the National Assembly of Pakistan as a candidate of Pakistan Tehreek-e-Insaf (PTI) from Constituency NA-61 (Rawalpindi-V) in 2018 Pakistani general election. He received 105,000 votes and defeated Malik Ibrar Ahmed.

On 18 August, Imran Khan formally announced his federal cabinet structure and Kiani was named as Minister for National Health Services, Regulations and Coordination. On 20 August 2018, he was sworn in as Federal Minister for National Health Services, Regulations and Coordination in the federal cabinet of Prime Minister Imran Khan. On 18 April 2019, in mega reshuffle, Prime Minister Imran Khan took his post down due to public pressure of medicine price increase.

References

Living people
Pakistani MNAs 2018–2023
Year of birth missing (living people)